José Benito Ríos González (born 4 March 1935–30 May 2008) was a Chilean footballer.

Honours

Club
Lota Schawager
 Segunda División: 1969

Individual
 Campeonato Nacional (Chile) Top-Scorer: 1959

References

External links
 Sanluissa.cl Profile
 Laceleste.cl Profile

1935 births
2008 deaths
Chilean footballers
Unión La Calera footballers
O'Higgins F.C. footballers
San Luis de Quillota footballers
Lota Schwager footballers
Ñublense footballers
C.D. Huachipato footballers
Primera B de Chile players
Chilean Primera División players
Association football forwards